Acacia profusa is a shrub of the genus Acacia and the subgenus Phyllodineae that is endemic to south western Australia.

Description
It has glabrous and occasionally resinous. Like many species of Acacia it has phyllodes rather than true leaves. The crowded and evergreen phyllodes are erect or ascending. It blooms from September to October and produces yellow flowers.

Taxonomy
The species was first formally described by the botanist Bruce Maslin in 1999 as a part of the work Acacia miscellany. The taxonomy of fifty-five species of Acacia, primarily Western Australian, in section Phyllodineae. as published in the journal Nuytsia. It was reclassified as Racosperma profusum by Leslie Pedley in 2003 then transferred back to genus Acacia in 2006.

Distribution
It is native to an area in the Wheatbelt and Goldfields-Esperance region of Western Australia extending from around Lake Grace in the north west to around Esperance in the south east where it is commonly situated on flats growing in clay to loamy or sandy-loamy soils. The bulk of the population is located from around Frank Hann National Park and Peak Eleonora to the south of Norseman in the north to around Mount Ridley to the north of Esperance in the south east where it is a part of open dwarf shrub, shrub mallee or low heath communities.

See also
List of Acacia species

References

profusa
Acacias of Western Australia
Taxa named by Bruce Maslin
Plants described in 1999